Arthur Karanicolas (born 10 July 1944) is a former Australian rules footballer who played for the North Melbourne Football Club in the Victorian Football League (VFL).

Notes

External links 
		

Living people
1944 births
Australian rules footballers from Victoria (Australia)
North Melbourne Football Club players